The Timeline of Art Nouveau shows notable works and events of Art Nouveau (an international style of art, architecture and applied art) as well as of local movements included in it (Modernisme, Glasgow School, Vienna Secession, Jugendstil, Stile Liberty, Tiffany Style and others).

Main events are written in bold.

If two or more objects or events are presented any given year, a work or an event featured in "Images" column is italicized.

Objects included in UNESCO World Heritage List are marked with asterisk*.

See also 
 Paris architecture of the Belle Époque
 Art Nouveau architecture in Russia
 Art Nouveau architecture in Riga
 Art Nouveau in Alcoy
 Art Nouveau in Antwerp
 Valencian Art Nouveau
 National Romantic style
 Art Nouveau religious buildings
 Art Nouveau furniture

Notes

References 

 
Art movements
Decorative arts
Modern art
Art movements in Europe